The 1976 NASCAR Grand National Winston Cup Series was the 28th season of professional stock car racing in the United States and the 5th modern era NASCAR Cup series. The season began on Sunday, January 18 and ended on Sunday, November 21. Cale Yarborough, driving the #11 Junior Johnson Holly Farms Chevrolet scored his first of three consecutive NASCAR Grand National Series Winston Cup Championships. Skip Manning was named NASCAR Rookie of the Year.

Season recap

Race Summaries

 Winston Western 500 - Bobby Allison won the pole in Roger Penske's final race fielding a Matador and led the first 18 laps.  Richard Petty started 27th and stormed through the field to lead 15 laps but fell out with engine failure.  David Pearson led 124 laps for his first road course win since 1966 and the Wood Brothers Racing team's first Riverside win since 1968.  Darrell Waltrip crashed on Lap 18 when his brakes failed entering Turn Eight; he plowed over the fencing and landed near a spectator fence but drove back to the pits; he ultimately finished 21st.
 Daytona 500 – From disallowance of qualifying times for A. J. Foyt, Dave Marcis, and Darrell Waltrip to the crashing of race leaders Richard Petty and David Pearson a half-mile from the checkered flag - the finish broadcast live on Wide World of Sports - the 1976 500 became one of the most celebrated races in history, and national interest in stock car racing began swelling with the finish. 
 Carolina 500 – Richard Petty won going away in a race marred by a huge melee on the backstretch where Bobby Allison tumbled.
 Richmond 400 Cale Yarborough's bid for his first win of the season ended when he crashed with twelve laps to go.  Dave Marcis edged Richard Petty in a battle of Dodges.
 Southeastern 400 Yarborough finally broke through, leading 285 laps and putting runner-up Darrell Waltrip a lap down.   Petty lost the point lead to Benny Parsons (who finished third) after a crash with Cecil Gordon and Bill Champion just 64 laps in.
 Atlanta 500 – NASCAR mandated smaller carburetors beginning with this race.  David Pearson spent 225 laps fighting to get back onto the lead lap and took his third win of the season, beating Parsons.  Yarborough finished third, a lap down after making up three laps of a four-lap deficit.
 Gwyn Staley 400 - Dave Marcis won the pole but finished a distant eighth as Cale Yarborough won at Junior Johnson's home track, leading 364 laps and putting runner-up Richard Petty a lap down.  Benny Parsons led 23 laps and finished fourth.
 Rebel 500 - Pearson ran down Buddy Baker in a race where his father Buck finished sixth.  Bobby Allison and Darrell Waltrip were involved in a hard crash at Lap 80 while Petty and Yarborough fell out with engine failures; Petty had led 52 laps while Cale led 16. 
 Virginia 500 – Cale Yarborough crashed when Dave Marcis' rearend spilled fluid while dueling for the lead. Darrell Waltrip thus took the win, his first with Gatorade sponsorship.
 Winston 500 – Buddy Baker qualified twelfth, a run so disappointing his Bud Moore team drove the over four hours back to their Spartanburg, SC shop to overhaul the engine before returning to Talladega for the race.  Baker nonetheless became the first driver to win a 500-miler in less than three hours, while an early-race crash with Pearson, Dave Marcis, and Dick Brooks eliminated Benny Parsons and cost him the point lead (and a $10,000 bonus awarded to the driver who accumulated the most points per third of the season) to runner-up Yarborough.  Richard Petty finished fourth after he stalled the car on an early pitstop and lost a lap.
Music City 420  - Yarborough led 398 of 420 laps at the Nashville Fairgrounds to his third short track win of the season.  Richard Petty and pole-sitter Benny Parsons finished 2-3 after leading a combined six laps.  Darrell Waltrip, long a Fairgrounds regular, led seven laps but finished 12th with rearend failure. 
 Mason-Dixon 500 - Benny Parsons suffered nose damage in a mid-race crash but his Chevrolet ran stronger after the wreck; he stormed to lead 161 of the race's last 169 laps and beat Pearson by 25 seconds.  Cale Yarborough led 243 laps but was penalized a lap on a pitstop, then fell out with engine failure; he thus lost the point lead to Parsons.
 World 600 – Pearson edged Petty and Cale Yarborough as Bruton Smith made his official return to Charlotte Motor Speedway; among his first acts was posting $18,000 in lap leader bonuses payable to whoever led the most laps per 100 miles.  Pearson and Yarborough fought for the lead and combined to lead 243 of the first 251 laps but Cale lost a lap with a cut tire and finished third; Petty led 56 laps.  Janet Guthrie made her NASCAR debut.
Riverside 400  - Pearson completed a season sweep at Riverside after a race-long chase with Bobby Allison and Yarborough.  
 CAM2 Motor Oil 400 - Cale Yarborough dominated until he lost power due to a blown head gasket (still finishing second) and Pearson took his seventh win of the season.  Cale's runner-up finish regained him the point lead as Benny Parsons lost 21 laps and finished 19th.
 Firecracker 400 - Cale Yarborough edged Pearson and Bobby Allison  for his first Daytona win since 1968.  A. J. Foyt won the pole.  
 Nashville 420 - Neil Bonnett drove most of the race for pole-sitter Bobby Allison; days before Allison was injured in a bad crash at Elko, MN and had to give way to Bonnett after the opening lap; the Penske #2 finished a distant seventh.  Buddy Baker led 220 laps but fell out while leading with 90 laps to go; Benny Parsons took over and beat Richard Petty and Darrell Waltrip.  Waltrip's third place at his home track came following the hiring by DiGard of engine builder Marion "Ducky" Newman, who'd left Bud Moore's team in a salary dispute.
 Purolator 500 – NASCAR allowed teams to use larger carburetors again beginning with Pocono.  The lead changed 47 times - a season high promptly broken a week later -  as Pearson's blown tire coming to the white flag gave Petty only his second win of the season. Buddy Baker finished second.  Benny Parsons edged Pearson for third while pole-sitter Cale Yarborough blew his engine halfway through; Junior Johnson's team changed engines in the garage in 33 minutes and Yarborough finished 25th; he lost the points lead to Parsons.
 Talladega 500 – Dave Marcis took his only Talladega win and the first for crew chief Harry Hyde; it was the first superspeedway win for Hyde's K&K Insurance Dodge since 1973.  The lead changed a season-high 57 times.  Benny Parsons blew his engine after 39 laps while Cale suffered another engine failure, yet Junior Johnson's team changed engines mid-race again, this time in 20 minutes.  Richard Petty blew his engine after taking the lead in the final 20 laps; with this combination of DNFs Cale thus took the point lead for what proved to be the final time.  Darrell Waltrip blew his engine and following the race DiGard fired team manager Mario Rossi and engine builders Carroll "Stump" Davis and Keith Harlan; the team hired Robert Yates to assist Marion Newman.
 Champion Spark Plug 400 – David Pearson took his eighth win of the season, but first since the June event at Michigan International Speedway.  Cale Yarborough finished second; Junior Johnson hired a security guard to watch his engines, suspecting sabotage after back-to-back engine failures.
  Volunteer 400  - Cale Yarborough took his fifth win of the season leading 373 laps.  Darrell Waltrip won the pole, his first with Robert Yates-Ducky Newman power, and led 27 laps to finish third. 
 Southern 500 – Pearson took the one race he had sought his entire career.  A big wreck occurred after Buddy Baker blew up and spun; behind him Skip Manning spun and was hit in the left side door by Joe Frasson.  Cale Yarborough hit a guardrail post on pit road and it bent the rearend assembly; Richard Childress helped the Junior Johnson crew replace the assembly and Cale finished 23rd; Richard Petty finished second despite hammering the wall off the track's infamous fourth turn and cut Cale's point lead to 29.  Darrell Waltrip and Dave Marcis were the two remaining cars on the lead lap. 
 Capital City 400 - Bobby Allison made his most determined bid for a win of the season, chasing Cale Yarborough and finished one length back at the finish.  Cale increased his point lead over Petty to 44.
 Delaware 500 - Cale Yarborough made up two laps on two separate occasions and won his second straight race.
 Old Dominion 500 - Darrell Waltrip won the pole, his second since the hiring of Robert Yates, but could only finish second to Cale as rain cut short the 500-lap race at 340 laps.
 Wilkes 400 - Yarborough won his fourth straight race and season-leading ninth overall.
 National 500 - Donnie Allison surprised the field in a backup Hoss Ellington Monte Carlo; the engine measured a tick over the legal displacement in immediate post race inspection but after cooling down the engine was within limits; Ellington stated, "This one's legal.  We left all the cheater stuff at Darlington."  The win was Donnie's first in Grand National competition since 1971. 57 year old veteran Buck Baker competed in his final Winston Cup race. The two-time champion finished 24th in the #59 Monte Carlo fielded by H.C. Porter.
 American 500 - Richard Petty took the win, only his third of the season.  Lennie Pond finished second.  Green flag pit stops became frequent as Petty spent a total of 125 seconds in the pits to Pond's 54 seconds.
 Dixie 500 –  Dave Marcis took his final superspeedway win after a race-long duel with Yarborough, Pearson, and Buddy Baker; Richard Benyo of Stock Car Racing Magazine described the initial 62 laps as a battle where "Marcis was able to nose Pearson, Yarborough, and Baker to the stripe" from Laps 14 through 62.  Dale Earnhardt made his third career start in this race and survived a vicious tumble after hitting the spinning Ford of Dick Brooks.  Richard Petty's engine failure all but clinched the season championship for Cale Yarborough.  During the weekend Penske Racing issued a press release stating Bobby Allison, fresh from victory in a USAC 200-mile stock car race at Texas World Speedway in the Penske Mercury, would return to the team for 1977.
 LA Times 500 – Pearson led the final 121 laps and easily posted his eighth super-speedway win and tenth overall of the season.  Yarborough clinched the season championship (his first and also the first for team owner Junior Johnson) by taking the green flag, only to fall out with transmission trouble after leading 68 laps.  Bobby Allison blew his engine simultaneously with his brother Donnie and after the race told Roger Penske he was leaving the team.

Daytona 500

Dixie 500

Firecracker 400

Gwyn Staley 400

Los Angeles Times 500

Full Drivers’ Championship

(key) Bold – Pole position awarded by time. Italics – Pole position set by owner's points. * – Most laps led.

References

External links
 Winston Cup Standings and Statistics for 1976

 

NASCAR Cup Series seasons